Anne is a feminine (sometimes masculine) given name.

Anne may also refer to:

Arts and entertainment
 "Anne" (Buffy the Vampire Slayer episode), 1998
 Anne (Little Britain), a character in Little Britain
 Anne (British TV series), a 2022 British miniseries about activist Anne Williams
 Anne (Turkish TV series), 2016–2017
 Anne with an E (titled Anne for its first season), a 2017 Canadian television series based on the novel Anne of Green Gables

Ships
 Ann (ship), a list of ships named Ann or Anne
 , several ships of the Royal Navy

Other
 Anne (band), an American dream pop band 
 Anne (novel), by Constance Fenimore Woolson, 1880
 "Anne", a song by Kayak from the 1980 album Periscope Life

See also
 , including many people with forename Anne
 
 Anastasia
 Anna (disambiguation)
 Anneliese
 Annie (disambiguation)
 Anni (disambiguation)
 Ann (disambiguation)
 Anya
 Princess Anne (disambiguation)
 Queen Anne (disambiguation)
 Saint Anne (disambiguation)